Elections to the 48th Arizona Legislature were held on November 7, 2006.  Primary elections to determine political party nominees were held on September 12, 2006. The two candidates with the highest vote count in each primary advanced to the November election.

The Legislature is composed of 30 legislative districts, each electing two Representatives (to the Arizona House of Representatives) and one Senator (to the Arizona Senate). No person may serve more than four consecutive terms in either body. Members of the Republican Party currently hold a majority of seats in both the House and Senate.

State House of Representatives

State Senate

R=Republican, D=Democratic, L=Libertarian, I=Independent/No Affiliation

Analysis
Five incumbents—three Democrats and two Republicans— retired and didn't seek another elective office. Eleven State House members ran for the State Senate, and one State Senator ran for a seat in the State House; switching between chambers, especially when a term limit has been reached in one chamber, is a common occurrence in the Arizona Legislature. Two members of the State Legislature sought statewide offices, and one sought election to the United States House of Representatives.

There were 14 races in which an incumbent Senator or both the incumbent Representatives are sought reelection and faced a primary challenge for the nomination(s) of their respective parties. Out of the 90 state legislative races, there are only six in which there are candidates ran without opposition.

The Republican Party needed to pick up one seat in the State House and two in the State Senate and lose none of their own in either chamber to gain a legislature that could override a Governor's veto. The Democratic Party needed to pick up nine seats in the State House without losing any of their own to form a House majority, and pick up three in the State Senate without losing any of their own to form a Senate majority.

See also
 2006 Arizona statewide elections
 Political party strength in U.S. states

References

https://web.archive.org/web/20121017223640/http://www.azsos.gov/election/2006/General/2006_General_results_query.htm

Arizona Legislature elections
2006 Arizona elections
Arizona State Legislature